The , or Imperial Aid Association, was the Empire of Japan's ruling organization during much of World War II. It was created by Prime Minister Fumimaro Konoe on 12 October 1940, to promote the goals of his  ("New Order") movement. It evolved into a "statist" ruling political party which aimed at removing the sectionalism in the politics and economics in the Empire of Japan to create a totalitarian one-party state, in order to maximize the efficiency of Japan's total war effort in China. When the organization was launched officially, Konoe was hailed as a "political savior" of a nation in chaos; however, internal divisions soon appeared.

Origins

During the summer of 1937, Konoe appointed 37 members chosen from a broad political spectrum to a preparatory committee which met in Karuizawa, Nagano. The committee included Konoe's political colleagues Fumio Gotō, Count Yoriyasu Arima and entrepreneur and right-wing spokesman Fusanosuke Kuhara. A radical wing of the military was represented by Kingoro Hashimoto, while the traditionalist military wings were represented by Senjūrō Hayashi, Heisuke Yanagawa and Nobuyuki Abe.

Konoe proposed originally that the Imperial Rule Assistance Association be organized along national syndicalist lines, with new members assigned to branches based on occupation, which would then develop channels for mass participation of the common population to "assist with the Imperial Rule".

However, from the start, there was no consensus in a common cause, as the leadership council represented all ends of the political spectrum, and in the end, the party was organized along geographic lines, following the existing political sub-divisions. Therefore, all local government leaders at each level of village, town, city and prefectural government automatically received the equivalent position within their local Imperial Rule Assistance Association branch.

Ideals

Prior to creation of the Imperial Rule Assistance Association, Konoe had already passed the National Mobilization Law, which effectively nationalized strategic industries, the news media, and labor unions, in preparation for total war with China.

Labor unions were replaced by the Nation Service Draft Ordinance, which empowered the government to draft civilian workers into critical war industries. This was urged to "restore the spirit and virtues of old Japan".

Some objections to it came on the grounds that , imperial polity, already required all imperial subjects to support imperial rule.

In addition to drumming up support for the ongoing wars in China and in the Pacific, the Imperial Rule Assistance Association helped maintain public order and provided certain public services via the  neighborhood association program. It also played a role in increasing productivity, monitoring rationing, and organizing civil defense.

The Imperial Rule Assistance Association was also militarized, with its members donning khaki-colored uniforms. In the last period of the conflict, the membership received military training and was projected to integrate with the Volunteer Fighting Corps in case of the anticipated Allied invasion.

Development
The 6 November 1940 issue of  explained the purpose of this infrastructure:

The  movement has already turned on the switch for rebuilding a new Japan and completing a new Great East Asian order which, writ large, is the construction of a new world order. The  is, broadly speaking, the New Order movement which will, in a word, place One Hundred Million into one body under this new organisation that will conduct all of our energies and abilities for the sake of the nation. Aren't we all mentally prepared to be members of this new organization and, as one adult to another, without holding our superiors in awe or being preoccupied with the past, cast aside all private concerns in order to perform public service?

In February 1942, all women's associations were merged into the Greater Japan Women's Association which joined the Imperial Rule Assistance Association in May. Every adult woman in Japan, excepting the under twenty and unmarried, was forced to join the Association.

In March 1942, Prime Minister Hideki Tōjō attempted to eliminate the influence of elected politicians by establishing an officially sponsored election nomination commission, which restricted non-government-sanctioned candidates from the ballot.

The Imperial Rule Assistance Association was formally dissolved on 13 June 1945, around three months before the end of World War II in the Pacific Theater. During the Allied occupation of Japan, the American authorities purged thousands of government leaders from public life for having been members of the Association. Later, many of them returned to prominent roles in Japanese politics after the end of the occupation.

Leaders

Popular support and electoral results

Notes

References

External links

1940 establishments in Japan
1945 disestablishments in Japan
Banned political parties
Defunct political parties in Japan
Japan in World War II
Nationalist parties in Japan
Parties of one-party systems
Political parties disestablished in 1945
Political parties established in 1940
Politics of the Empire of Japan
Shōwa Statism
Monarchist parties in Japan
National conservative parties
Social conservative parties
Anti-communist parties
Defunct conservative parties